Douglas Underwood (born 28 May 1946) is an Australian former motorcycle speedway rider.

Biography
Born in Perth, Western Australia, Underwood's early racing experience was in scrambles, finishing runner-up in the 1969 West Australian Scrambles Championship and tenth in the 1970 Australian Scrambles Championship (in the unlimited class). In 1971 he took up speedway, and after riding at Claremont Speedway in 1971/2, rode in the second division in Britain in 1972 for Scunthorpe Saints (now called the Scunthorpe Scorpions). After averaging over five points per match in his debut season, he improved to over 6.5 in 1974, which together with some impressive performances at Leicester Stadium attracted interest from top flight Leicester Lions, who signed him in 1975. He rode for Leicester in the British League and Teesside Tigers in the National League in 1975. During the 1977 season he transferred to Reading Racers, for whom he rode until 1979. when he transferred to Weymouth Wildcats. He retired at the end of the 1979 season.

Underwood rode internationally for Australia against the British Lions in both 1971/2 and 1974/5. He also rode in the Young Australasia team against England in 1974.

Underwood was a carpenter by trade, and also competed in rifle shooting, representing Western Australia in the Air Cadets Rifle Shooting Championship. As a result of his time shooting he is deaf in one ear.

References

1946 births
Australian speedway riders
Scunthorpe Scorpions riders
Middlesbrough Bears riders
Leicester Lions riders
Swindon Robins riders
Reading Racers riders
Weymouth Wildcats riders
Sportsmen from Western Australia
Living people
Sportspeople from Perth, Western Australia